David Gravel (born June 23, 1992) is an American professional racing driver. He last competed full-time in the World of Outlaws Sprint Car Series, driving the No. 2 Maxim for Big Game Motorsports, in the NASCAR Gander RV & Outdoors Truck Series, driving the No. 24 Chevrolet Silverado for GMS Racing, and in the ARCA Menards Series, driving the No. 28 Chevrolet SS for KBR Development. Gravel won the Knoxville Nationals in 2019.

Racing career

Early years
Growing up in Connecticut, Gravel started his racing career in quarter midgets before moving up to Legends cars on asphalt and then to dirt micro-sprints.

Dirt racing
In 2008, Gravel competed full-time with the United Racing Club and became the youngest winner in the history of the series. For the next four years, he raced in the All Star Circuit of Champions, scoring three top-three points finishes.  

Gravel started making sporadic World of Outlaws appearances in 2008; he eventually won the series' Rookie of the Year award in 2013. He ran for Roth Motorsports in 2014, Destiny Motorsports in 2015 and from 2016 to 2018 drove for CJB Motorsports.

Gravel raced with Jason Johnson Racing in 2019, driving the team's No. 41 car to a third-place finish in the season-long point standings and winning the Knoxville Nationals and Jason Johnson Classic. He also participated in the 2019 Chili Bowl Midget Nationals, advancing to the A-main. After the season, he confirmed a return to JJR for another full-season effort in 2020, although that was eventually slimmed down to about 85 percent of the season's schedule after Gravel signed with NASCAR team GMS Racing for 2020.

After the COVID-19 pandemic temporarily stopped the WoO season, Gravel won the tour's first race back, held with no fans at Knoxville on May 8. He later won a premiere All Star Circuit of Champions race at Eldora Speedway. In his 600th WoO start, Gravel won at Williams Grove Speedway in the National Open preliminary. Gravel started his first USAC Silvercrown race on the dirt at the Springfield Mile; he started last and finished second behind Kyle Larson.

Pavement racing
On January 10, 2020, Gravel announced a six-race slate in the NASCAR Gander RV & Outdoors Truck Series, driving for GMS Racing. The announced schedule included the series' only dirt race, a July date at Eldora Speedway. As part of the deal, Gravel would also run the 2020 ARCA Menards Series season-opener at Daytona International Speedway with GMS affiliate team KBR Development.

Motorsports career results

NASCAR

Gander RV & Outdoors Truck Series

ARCA Menards Series 
(key) (Bold – Pole position awarded by qualifying time. Italics – Pole position earned by points standings or practice time. * – Most laps led.)

References

External links
 

Living people
1992 births
Racing drivers from Connecticut
World of Outlaws drivers
ARCA Menards Series drivers
NASCAR drivers
People from Watertown, Connecticut
USAC Silver Crown Series drivers